Brezula is a settlement in the Municipality of Rače–Fram in northeastern Slovenia. It lies on the flatlands on the right bank of the river Drava to the south of Maribor. The area is part of the traditional region of Styria. The municipality is now included in the Drava Statistical Region.

The village chapel was built in the last quarter of the 19th century.

References

External links
Brezula at Geopedia

Populated places in the Municipality of Rače-Fram